A countdown is the backward counting to indicate the remaining time before an event occurs.

Countdown may also refer to:

Arts, entertainment, and media

Comics
 Countdown (Polystyle Publications), a British comic book series
 Countdown (comic strip), the title strip in the series
 Countdown to Final Crisis, an American comic book series published by DC comics
 Countdown to Infinite Crisis, an American one-shot comic book published by DC Comics
 Star Trek: Countdown, a comic book prequel to the 2009 film Star Trek

Films
 Countdown (1968 film), directed by Robert Altman
 Countdown (2004 film), a Russian action film directed by Yevgeny Lavrentyev
 Countdown (2011 film), a South Korean film directed by Huh Jong-Ho
 Countdown (2012 film), a Thai film
 Countdown (2016 film), an American action film
 Countdown (2019 film), an American horror film

Games and toys
 Countdown (G.I. Joe), a fictional astronaut
 Countdown (video game), a 1990 point-and-click adventure game
 Countdown, a Holiday Beanie Babies teddy bear

Literature

 Countdown (novel), a 2014 book by Natalie Standiford in The 39 Clues franchise
 Countdown (novel series), a 1999 young adult series by Daniel Parker
 Countdown, a non-fiction book by Amitav Ghosh

Music
 Countdown, another name for The Countdown Singers

Albums
Countdown (Jimmy McGriff album), a 1983 album by jazz organist Jimmy McGriff
Countdown (Steve Kuhn album), a 1998 album by jazz pianist Steve Kuhn 
Countdown (Super Junior-D&E album), a 2021 album by Super Junior-D&E
Countdown 1992–1983, a compilation album by the band Pulp
The Countdown, a 1988 album by jazz pianist Mulgrew Miller
Countdown, an album by Joey Alexander
Countdown, an album by Marie Wegener released in 2019

Songs
 "Countdown" (Beyoncé song)
 "Countdown" (Hardwell and MAKJ song)
 "Countdown" (Hyde song)
 "Countdown" (Pulp song)
 "Countdown" (Rush song)
 "Countdown" (John Coltrane song), 1960
 "Count Down", a song on Rock 'n' Roll Circus by Ayumi Hamasaki
 "Countdown", a song on The Big Come Up by The Black Keys
 "Countdown", a song on Out of the Cradle by Lindsey Buckingham
 "Countdown", a song on I Wanna Thank Me by Snoop Dogg
 "Countdown, a song on Victorious 2.0: More Music from the Hit TV Show by Leon Thomas III and Victoria Justice

Television

Programs
 Countdown (Armenian TV series), a 2017 Armenian thriller television series aired on Armenia Premium
 Countdown (Australian TV program), a 1974–1987 Australian music television program broadcast by ABC
 Countdown (Canadian TV program), a 1996–2017 Canadian music television program broadcast by MuchMusic
 Countdown (Dutch TV program), a 1978–1994 Dutch music television program broadcast by Veronica
 Countdown (game show), a British television game show broadcast on Channel 4 since 1982
 Countdown, a television program on Bloomberg TV Philippines
 Countdown – Die Jagd beginnt (Countdown – The hunt begins), a German television series
 Countdown with Keith Olbermann, an American television news program
 Countdown with Mike Duffy, a television news program hosted by Mike Duffy (born 1946)
 Count Down TV, a Japanese late-night music television program

Episodes
 Countdown (FlashForward), an episode of the ABC series FlashForward
 "Countdown" (Haven), an episode of the American television series Haven
 "Countdown" (Star Trek: Enterprise), a 2004 television episode
 "Countdown", an episode of the French animated television series Code Lyoko: Evolution
 "Countdown", an episode of the American television series MacGyver
 The Countdown (The O.C.), an episode of the American television series The O.C.

Other uses
 Countdown (supermarket), in New Zealand
 NASCAR Countdown, a pre-race television show
 NBA Countdown, a pre-game television show
 Countdown, the physical film leader on which a countdown is printed
 Countdown, a sans serif typeface with "space age" connotations
 Countdown, a Tech character in Skylanders: Swap Force
 Passenger information systems, at railway stations

See also
 Countdown to Armageddon (disambiguation)
 Countdown to Doomsday (disambiguation)
 DC Countdown (disambiguation)
 The Final Countdown (disambiguation)